This is a list of television shows set in Washington, D.C.

Television shows

Miniseries

News

Stand-up comedy

References

Washington, D.C.